Eduardo Molina metro station is a Mexico City Metro station within the limits of Gustavo A. Madero and Venustiano Carranza, in Mexico City. It is an at-grade station with one island platform, served by Line 5 (the Yellow Line), between Consulado and Aragón stations. Eduardo Molina station serves the colonias (neighborhoods) of 20 de Noviembre and Malinche. The station is named after Eduardo Molina Arévalo, an engineer who helped to solve the problem of water scarcity in the Valley of Mexico in the mid-20th century, and its pictogram represents two hands holding water, as featured on the mural El agua, origen de la vida, painted by Mexican muralist Diego Rivera in the Cárcamo de Dolores, in Chapultepec, Mexico City. Eduardo Molina metro station was opened on 19 December 1981, on the first day of the Consulado–Pantitlán service. In 2019, the station had an average daily ridership of 6,811 passengers, making it the 176th busiest station in the network and the ninth busiest of the line.

Location
Eduardo Molina is a metro station located on Río Consulado Avenue, in northeastern Mexico City. The station serves the colonias (Mexican Spanish for "neighborhoods") of 20 de Noviembre, in Venustiano Carranza, and Malinche, in Gustavo A. Madero. Within the system, the station lies between Consulado and Aragón stations.

The area is serviced by Line 5 of the Metrobús system at Río Consulado bus station, a few blocks away, as well as by Route 200 of the Red de Transporte de Pasajeros network, and by Route 20-B of the city's public bus system.

Exits
There are two exits:
North: Río Consulado Avenue and Norte 86 Street, Malinche, Gustavo A. Madero.
South: Río Consulado Avenue, 20 de Noviembre, Venustiano Carranza.

History and construction
Line 5 of the Mexico City Metro was built by Cometro, a subsidiary of Empresas ICA, and its first section was opened on 19 December 1981, operating from Pantitlán to Consulado stations. The station is named after , a Mexican engineer who helped to solve the problem of water scarcity in the Valley of Mexico in the mid-20th century through the Lerma River system, and the station's pictogram features two hands holding water, a reference to a fragment of the mural El agua, origen de la vida, painted by Diego Rivera inside the main building of the Cárcamo de Dolores, a hydraulic sump structure in Chapultepec, Mexico City.

Incidents
After the 2015 Oceanía station train crash, Eduardo Molina metro station was temporarily closed for repairs.  On 31 July 2018, three railroad cars uncoupled while a train was traveling at the Consulado–Eduardo Molina interstation, with no injuries reported. When the incident was reviewed, authorities found that the nuts that kept the cars together were damaged. From 23 April to 15 June 2020, the station was temporarily closed due to the COVID-19 pandemic in Mexico.

Ridership
According to the data provided by the authorities since the 2000s, commuters have averaged per year between 3,600 and 8,600 daily entrances in the last decade. In 2019, before the impact of the COVID-19 pandemic on public transport, the station's ridership totaled 2,486,165 passengers, which was a decrease of 75,730 passengers compared to 2018. In the same year, Eduardo Molina metro station was the 176th busiest station of the system's 195 stations, and it was the line's 9th busiest.

Gallery

Notes

References

External links
 
 
 

1981 establishments in Mexico
Mexico City Metro Line 5 stations
Mexico City Metro stations in Gustavo A. Madero, Mexico City
Mexico City Metro stations in Venustiano Carranza, Mexico City
Railway stations opened in 1981